The Waterford Institute of Technology (WIT) was an institute of technology, located in Waterford, Ireland. The institute had six constituent schools and offered programmes in business, engineering, science, health sciences, as well as education & humanities.

The institute opened in 1970 as a Regional Technical College and adopted its name on 7 May 1997. Along with the Institute of Technology, Carlow, the institute was dissolved on 1 May 2022 and was succeeded by the South East Technological University.

History
At the time of the founding of the RTC, there were two other third-level institutions in the city, St John's Seminary Waterford News and Star which notes the closing of the St John's Seminary in 1999 and De La Salle Brothers teacher training college, but both had been closed.

Waterford politicians made strenuous but unsuccessful efforts to locate a university in Waterford at the time of the formation of the Queen's University of Ireland in the 1840s. The cause was led by Thomas Wyse, Member of Parliament for Waterford City, who was not influential in the House of Commons, having strong Napoleonic links (he married a niece of Napoleon I of France), being a Catholic and leaning towards an independent Ireland. Galway, a much smaller city at the time, won out over Waterford, perhaps because of the necessity for geographical dispersion or to bolster the Irish language. Wyse wrote in the round on the matter in his text "Education reform or the necessity of a national system of education" (London, 1836).

The institute was founded in 1970 as the Regional Technical College, Waterford. Once founded, the regional technical college grew very quickly as a result of the obviously strong regional need for tertiary education. In 1997 the college adopted its present name by order of the Minister for Education Niamh Bhreathnach, with Dublin Institute of Technology being the only other institution with the "institute of technology" title at the time in Ireland. Following a change of government and enormous political pressure on behalf of other regional technical colleges, especially Cork Regional Technical College, all other regional technical colleges were renamed similarly by Minister for Education Micheál Martin.

Since 2001, the institute had conferred its own awards at all levels from Higher Certificate to PhD, subject to standards set and monitored by the Higher Education and Training Awards Council (HETAC) which was established by the Government in June 2001, under the Qualifications (Education and Training) Act, 1999.
In October 2005 the institute was selected by The Sunday Times newspaper as the "Institute of Technology of the Year" in Ireland.

The institute now has a student population of approximately 6,000 full-time students and 1,000 part-time students. The Staff currently consists of approximately 470 Full-time academic, 300 part-time and 300 support staff.

The institute formally applied in 2006 for university status in accordance with the Universities Act, 1997, and the process of examining the case for redesignation has commenced. In January 2007 Dr Jim Port was engaged by the government to carry out a "preliminary assessment" of the institute's case.

Ranking
In 2018, Webometrics placed WIT as the 7th best higher education body in Ireland (out of 32). The institute is also ranked at 10th place by Unirank, and the leading Irish institute of technology (with the exception of DIT, which is now classified as a Technology University).

Campuses

The institute has 5 campuses: Cork Road, College Street, Carriganore, the Applied Technology Building and the Granary.

Organisation
The institute is divided into 6 schools and their various departments.

Research at WIT

Research Centres
 Walton Institute
 Pharmaceutical and Molecular Biotechnology Research Centre (PMBRC)
 Eco-Innovation Research Centre 
 Nutrition Research Centre Ireland (formerly MPRG)
 South Eastern Applied Material Research (SEAM)

Research Groups

Technological University for the South East

The institute has been planning a joint application with IT Carlow for the formation of a technological university for the south east region since the mid-2010's. A vision document, "Technological University for the South East" (TUSE) was published in 2015, and a memorandum of understanding was signed in 2017. At the launch of TU Dublin in July 2018, the Taoiseach expressed regret that this TUSE bid had not progressed sufficiently following the Technological Universities Act 2018.

Notable alumni
Arts
Gráinne Mulvey – Irish composer, currently Professor and Head of Composition at the Technological University of Dublin
Máiréad Nesbitt – Irish fiddler, former member of the ensemble Celtic Woman

Politics
Ciara Conway – TD
Martin Cullen – Teachta Dála & Government Minister
Grace O'Sullivan – MEP
John Paul Phelan – Teachta Dála

Sport
Niamh Briggs – Irish Rugby Player
Setanta Ó hAilpín – GAA & Australian Football League player
Geordan Murphy – Irish Rugby Player
Henry Shefflin – GAA player
Ayo Williams – GAA player

Business
Philip Lynch – businessman, CEO of IAWS Group
Kerrie Power – businesswoman, CEO of HEAnet

See also
Education in Ireland
List of higher education institutions in Ireland

References

External links
Official WIT website
Research Groups within WIT
WIT Strategic Plan
WIT Institutional Repository

South East Technological University
Buildings and structures in Waterford (city)
Education in Waterford (city)
Educational institutions established in 1970
Waterford Institute of Technology